This article serves as an index - as complete as possible - of all the honorific orders or similar decorations received by the Negeri Sembilan Royal Family, classified by continent, awarding country and recipient.

This is a list of honours and titles received by the royal family of Negeri Sembilan, one of the thirteen states of Malaysia. The monarchy is not hereditary, but is elected by the council of Undangs or chiefs. The ruler bears the title of Yang di-Pertuan Besar, and the current ruler (since 2008) is His Royal Highness Tuanku Muhriz ibni Almarhum Tuanku Munawir.

Royal State of Negeri Sembilan 

They have been awarded :

 Family of Munawir of Negeri Sembilan
 * Muhriz of Negeri Sembilan, Yang di-Pertuan Besar 
  Royal Family Order of Negeri Sembilan Grand Master (since 29 December 2008) and Member (25.2.2009)
  Grand Master of the Order of Negeri Sembilan (since 29 December 2008)
  Grand Master and Recipient of the Royal Family Order of Yam Tuan Radin Sunnah (since 29 December 2008)
  Grand Master of the Order of Loyalty to Negeri Sembilan (since 29 December 2008)
  Founding Grand Master of the Order of Loyalty to Tuanku Muhriz (Negeri Sembilan) (since 14 January 2010)
  Founding Grand Master of the Order of Loyal Service to Negeri Sembilan (since 14 January 2010)
  Grand Master of the Grand Order of Tuanku Ja’afar (Negeri Sembilan) (since 29 December 2008 )
  Founding Grand Master of the Distinguished Conduct Order (Negeri Sembilan) (since ?)
  Recipient of the Distinguished Conduct Medal (PPT)
 Tuanku Aishah Rohani, Tunku Ampuan Besar of Negeri Sembilan
  Member of the Royal Family Order of Negeri Sembilan (DKNS, 21.04.2009)
  Knight Commander or Dato’ Paduka of the Grand Order of Tuanku Ja’afar (DPTJ) with title Dato'''
  Recipient of the Distinguished Conduct Medal (PPT) 
 Tunku Ali Redhauddin Muhriz, Yang di-Pertuan Besar's eldest son
  Recipient of the Royal Family Order of Yam Tuan Radin Sunnah (DKYR, 20.10.2009) 
 Tunku Zain al-’Abidin, Yang di-Pertuan Besar's second son
  Recipient of the Royal Family Order of Yam Tuan Radin Sunnah (DKYR, 20.10.2009) 
 Tunku Umpa Munawirah, Tunku Putri, Yang di-Pertuan Besar's eldest younger sister
  Recipient of the Royal Family Order of Yam Tuan Radin Sunnah (DKYR, 19.7.1986)
 Tunku Datin Anne Dakhlah, Yang di-Pertuan Besar's third sister
  Recipient of the Royal Family Order of Yam Tuan Radin Sunnah (DKYR, 14.1.2010)
 Dato’ ‘Abdu’l Malik bin Tan Sri Shaikh ‘Abdu’llah, her husband
  Knight Companion of the Order of Loyalty to Negeri Sembilan (DSNS), now Knight Commander (or Dato’ Paduka, DPNS) with title Dato Tunku Deborah, Yang di-Pertuan Besar's fourth sister
  Recipient of the Royal Family Order of Yam Tuan Radin Sunnah (DKYR, 14.1.2010)
 Y.Bhg. Dato’ Ahmad Fuad bin ‘Abdu’l Rahman, her husband
  Knight of the Order of Loyalty to Tuanku Muhriz (DSTM, 14.1.2011) with title Dato'''
 Tunku Deannah, Yang di-Pertuan Besar's fifth sister
  Recipient of the Royal Family Order of Yam Tuan Radin Sunnah (DKYR, 14.1.2010)

 Family of Jaafar of Negeri Sembilan

 H.R.H. Tuanku Najihah, widow of late  Yang di-Pertuan Besar Jaafar of Negeri Sembilan :
  Member of the Royal Family Order of Negeri Sembilan (DKNS) 
  Knight Grand Commander or Dato’ Sri Paduka of the Grand Order of Tuanku Ja’afar (SPTJ) with title Dato' Seri Tunku Naquiah, Tunku Dara, elder daughter and child of late  Yang di-Pertuan Besar Jaafar of Negeri Sembilan :
  Recipient of the Royal Family Order of Yam Tuan Radin Sunnah (DKYR, 16.8.1980)
  Knight Grand Commander or Dato’ Sri Paduka of the Grand Order of Tuanku Ja’afar (SPTJ) with title Dato' Seri  The Meritorious Service Medal (Pingat Jasa Kebaktian, PJK)
 Tunku Naquiyuddin, Tunku Laksamana, elder son and second child of late  Yang di-Pertuan Besar Jaafar of Negeri Sembilan :
  Member of the Royal Family Order of Negeri Sembilan (DKNS)
  Recipient of the Royal Family Order of Yam Tuan Radin Sunnah (DKYR)
   Knight Grand Commander or Dato’ Sri Paduka  Order of Loyalty to Negeri Sembilan (SPNS), now Principal Grand Knight (or Dato’ Sri Utama, SUNS) with title Dato' Seri Utama  Knight Grand Commander or Dato’ Sri Paduka of the Grand Order of Tuanku Ja’afar (SPTJ) with title Dato' Seri  The Distinguished Conduct Medal (Pingat Pekerti Terpilih, PPT)
  The Meritorious Service Medal (Pingat Jasa Kebaktian, PJK)
 Tunku Imran, Tunku Muda of Serting, second son and third child of late  Yang di-Pertuan Besar Jaafar of Negeri Sembilan : 
  Paramount of the Order of Negeri Sembilan (DTNS, 19.7.1999)
  Recipient of the Royal Family Order of Yam Tuan Radin Sunnah (DKYR)
   Knight Grand Commander or Dato’ Sri Paduka  Order of Loyalty to Negeri Sembilan (SPNS), now Principal Grand Knight (or Dato’ Sri Utama, SUNS) with title Dato' Seri Utama  The Meritorious Service Medal (Pingat Jasa Kebaktian, PJK)
 Tunku Jawahir, Tunku Putri, second daughter and fourth child of late  Yang di-Pertuan Besar Jaafar of Negeri Sembilan : 
  Recipient of the Royal Family Order of Yam Tuan Radin Sunnah (DKYR)
  Knight Grand Commander or Dato’ Sri Paduka of the Grand Order of Tuanku Ja’afar (SPTJ, 1997) with title Dato' Seri Tunku Irinah, Tunku Putri, third daughter and fifth child of late  Yang di-Pertuan Besar Jaafar of Negeri Sembilan : 
  Recipient of the Royal Family Order of Yam Tuan Radin Sunnah (DKYR)
  Knight Grand Commander or Dato’ Sri Paduka of the Grand Order of Tuanku Ja’afar (SPTJ, 19.7.1999) with title Dato' Seri Tunku Nazaruddin, Tunku Putra, third son and sixth child of late  Yang di-Pertuan Besar Jaafar of Negeri Sembilan : 
  Recipient of the Royal Family Order of Yam Tuan Radin Sunnah (DKYR)
  Knight Grand Commander or Dato’ Sri Paduka of the Grand Order of Tuanku Ja’afar (SPTJ, 22.7.2000) with title Dato' Seri Tunku Mimi Wahida binti Tunku ‘Abdu’llah Wahman, his wife :
  Knight Grand Commander or Dato’ Sri Paduka of the Grand Order of Tuanku Ja’afar (SPTJ, 19.7.2003) with title Dato' Seri Malaysia, sultanates and states 
They have been awarded :

 Malaysia 

 Muhriz of Negeri Sembilan, Yang di-Pertuan Besar 
  Recipient of the Order of the Crown of the Realm (DMN)
 H.R.H. Tuanku Najihah, widow of late  Yang di-Pertuan Besar Jaafar of Negeri Sembilan, as Raja Permaisuri Agong of Malaysia (26 April 1994 to 25 April 1999), she has been awarded : 
  Recipient of the Order of the Crown of the Realm (DMN) 
 Tunku Naquiah, Tunku Dara, elder daughter and child of late  Yang di-Pertuan Besar Jaafar of Negeri Sembilan :
  Member of the Order of the Defender of the Realm (AMN)
  Commander of the Order of Loyalty to the Crown of Malaysia (PSM) with title Tan Sri Tunku Imran, Tunku Muda of Serting, second son and third child of late  Yang di-Pertuan Besar Jaafar of Negeri Sembilan : 
  Commander of the Order of the Defender of the Realm (PMN, 1992) with title Tan Sri earlier  Member of the Order of the Defender of the Realm (AMN)
  Commander of the Order of Loyalty to the Crown of Malaysia (PSM) with title Tan Sri Sultanate of Johor 
 Muhriz of Negeri Sembilan, Yang di-Pertuan Besar 
  First Class of the Royal Family Order of Johor (DK I)

 Sultanate of Kedah 

 Muhriz of Negeri Sembilan, Yang di-Pertuan Besar 
  Member of the Royal Family Order of Kedah (DK, 17.1.2010)
 H.R.H. Tuanku Najihah, widow of late Yang di-Pertuan Besar Jaafar of Negeri Sembilan :
  Member of the Royal Family Order of Kedah (DK)

 Sultanate of Kelantan 

 Muhriz of Negeri Sembilan, Yang di-Pertuan Besar 
  Recipient of the Royal Family Order or Star of Yunus (DK)
 H.R.H. Tuanku Najihah, widow of late  Yang di-Pertuan Besar Jaafar of Negeri Sembilan :
  Recipient of the Royal Family Order or Star of Yunus (DK)
  Knight Grand Commander of the Order of the Crown of Kelantan or "Star of Muhammad" (SPMK, 11.11.1992) with title Dato

Sultanate of Perak 

 Muhriz of Negeri Sembilan, Yang di-Pertuan Besar 
  Recipient of the Royal Family Order of Perak (DK, 5.3.2009)

Sultanate of Perlis 

 Muhriz of Negeri Sembilan, Yang di-Pertuan Besar  
  Recipient of the Perlis Family Order of the Gallant Prince Syed Putra Jamalullail (DK)
 Tunku Mudziah, Tengku Puan Sharif Bendahara, Yang di-Pertuan Besar 's second younger sister
  Knight Grand Commander of the Order of the Crown of Perlis or Star of Safi (SPMP) with title Dato' Seri
 Tunku Naquiyuddin, Tunku Laksamana, elder son and second child of late Yang di-Pertuan Besar Jaafar of Negeri Sembilan :
  Knight Grand Commander of the Order of the Crown of Perlis or Star of Safi (SPMP, 2001) with title Dato' Seri

Sultanate of Selangor 

 Muhriz of Negeri Sembilan, Yang di-Pertuan Besar 
  First Class of the Royal Family Order of Selangor (DK I, 11.12.2009)
 Tunku Naquiyuddin, Tunku Laksamana, elder son and second child of late Yang di-Pertuan Besar Jaafar of Negeri Sembilan :
  Knight Grand Commander of the Order of the Crown of Selangor (SPMS) with title Dato' Seri

Sultanate of Terengganu 

 Muhriz of Negeri Sembilan, Yang di-Pertuan Besar 
  Member first class of the Family Order of Terengganu (DK I)

Asian honours 
They have been awarded :

Far East  

To be completed if any ...

Middle East   

to be completed if any

American  honours 
They have been awarded :

Chile 

 Tunku Naquiyuddin, Tunku Laksamana, elder son and second child of late Yang di-Pertuan Besar Jaafar of Negeri Sembilan :
  Grand Cross of the Order of Bernardo O'Higgins (2004)

To be completed if any other ...

European honours 
They have been awarded :

France 

Tunku Naquiyuddin, Tunku Laksamana, elder son and second child of late Yang di-Pertuan Besar Jaafar of Negeri Sembilan : 
  Officer of the National Order of Merit (1998)
  National Order of the Legion of Honour (2005)
  Ordre des Palmes Académiques

To be completed if any other ...

African honours 

To be completed if any ...

References

Notes 

 
Negeri Sembilan